Rachael Yamagata (born September 23, 1977) is an American singer-songwriter and pianist from Arlington, Virginia. She began her musical career with the band Bumpus before becoming a solo artist and releasing five EPs and four studio albums. Her songs have appeared on numerous television shows and she has collaborated with Jason Mraz, Rhett Miller, Bright Eyes, Ryan Adams, Toots and the Maytals and Ray Lamontagne.

Early life and education
Yamagata was born to a Japanese American father and an Italian-German mother. She graduated from the Holton-Arms School and attended Northwestern University and Vassar College.

Career
Yamagata became the vocalist for the Chicago group Bumpus and spent six years touring, writing and recording with the band before leaving in 2001 to begin a solo career. In September 2002, she obtained a two-record deal with Arista's Private Music and her self-titled EP produced by Malcolm Burn, Rachael Yamagata EP was released in October. Her first full-length album, Happenstance, followed in 2004. The album was produced by John Alagía at Compass Point Studios. Between 2003 and 2005, Yamagata played venues such as Amoeba Records and The Hotel Café, both in Hollywood.

Yamagata was featured on the album True Love by Toots and the Maytals, which won the Grammy Award in 2004 for Best Reggae Album, and showcased many notable musicians including Willie Nelson, Eric Clapton, Jeff Beck, Trey Anastasio, Gwen Stefani / No Doubt, Ben Harper, Bonnie Raitt, Manu Chao, The Roots, Ryan Adams, Keith Richards, Toots Hibbert, Paul Douglas, Jackie Jackson, Ken Boothe, and The Skatalites.

Yamagata toured with Mandy Moore and contributed a song to Moore's 2007 album, Wild Hope.

In May 2008, Yamagata released a three-song EP, Loose Ends.  Her second full-length album Elephants...Teeth Sinking Into Heart was released in October 2008. Billboard characterized the album as much darker and sadder in tone than its predecessor. That month, her two-song live acoustic video performance appeared on LiveDaily Sessions and featured the songs "Faster" and "Sunday Afternoon". In April 2009, Yamagata performed her song "Elephants" on the television drama One Life to Live.

Yamagata digitally released a new album in the fall of 2011 through Pledgemusic. Her third studio album Chesapeake was released through Frankenfish Records in October 2011. In 2012 Yamagata released her next EP called Heavyweight. Yamagata has appeared numerous times as a guest vocalist for other artists including: Jason Mraz's "Did You Get My Message?", "Fireflies" and "The Believer" by Rhett Miller, on Toots & the Maytals's album True Love, the song "Barfly" by Ray Lamontagne, and several songs on Ryan Adams' Cold Roses album. She contributed vocals to six songs on the Bright Eyes album Cassadaga. Yamagata contributed writing, keyboards and vocals to the song "Kaleidoscope" by Jill Cunniff a former member of Luscious Jackson. Yamagata also performs with an ensemble cast on the 30 Rock episode "Kidney Now!" The soundtrack for the film Dear John features the song "You Take My Troubles Away", Yamagata's duet with Dan Wilson. She also performs the Muppets song "I'm Going to Go Back There Someday" on a cover album, Muppets: The Green Album.

Yamagata again partnered with PledgeMusic for her album Tightrope Walker, released on September 23, 2016. She also offered an acoustic digital version of Happenstance as a pledge reward.

Personal life
Yamagata has a twin brother, Benji. Her half brother, Josh Ruben, is an actor and director for CollegeHumor.

Discography

Studio albums

Compilation albums

Extended plays

Singles

Original soundtrack contributions

Other soundtrack appearances
Yamagata's songs have appeared in a number of films and television shows. These include:

Notes

References

External links

Official website
Rachael Yamagata on NPR

1977 births
Living people
People from Arlington County, Virginia
American pop pianists
American people of Japanese descent
American people of Italian descent
American people of German descent
American women pop singers
American women singer-songwriters
Northwestern University School of Communication alumni
Vassar College alumni
RCA Records artists
Singer-songwriters from Virginia
American indie rock musicians
21st-century American women singers
21st-century American women pianists
21st-century American pianists
21st-century American singers